Balkisu Musa (born 1970) is a Nigerian weightlifter. She won a bronze medal at the 1999 World Weightlifting Championships in the +75 kg category.

Career 
Musa came fourth in the 1997 World Weightlifting Championships in the Women's +83 kg category. She won three gold medals at the 1999 All-Africa Games in South Africa. At the 1999 World Weightlifting Championships Musa lifted 252.5 kg (total), winning the bronze medal in the +75 kg category. When female weightlifting was included in the Olympics for the first time at the 2000 Summer Olympics, Musa was disqualified for taking steroids. She was banned for two years in total. At the 2003 World Weightlifting Championships, Musa was ranked 23rd in the +75 kg category, lifting a total of 215 kg.

In 2017, six Nigerian weightlifters trained by Musa participated in the African Junior Weightlifting Championship.

References  

1970 births
Living people
Nigerian female weightlifters
World Weightlifting Championships medalists
African Games gold medalists for Nigeria
African Games medalists in weightlifting
Competitors at the 1999 All-Africa Games
20th-century Nigerian women
21st-century Nigerian women